Aleksey Yuryevich Filonov (born 1961) is a Russian swimmer who won silver medals in the 4×100 m and 4×200 m freestyle relays at the 1982 World Aquatics Championships. He also won three medals at the Summer Universiades of 1981 and 1983.

After retirement he won multiple medals in the masters category:
World championships 2004: 1 gold (100 m butterfly) and 2 silver (100 m freestyle and 50 m butterfly)
European championships: 7 gold, 4 silver, 2 bronze (2003, 2007, 2011)
Soviet championships 1991: 2 gold
 Russian championships: 14 gold, 33 records (1998–2011)

He is the president of the Moscow Swimming Federation.

References

1961 births
Living people
Russian male freestyle swimmers
Russian male swimmers
World Aquatics Championships medalists in swimming
Universiade medalists in swimming
Universiade gold medalists for the Soviet Union
Universiade silver medalists for the Soviet Union
Medalists at the 1981 Summer Universiade